Robert Charles Johnson was an Australian rules footballer for the Port Adelaide Football Club. In 1935, his final year at the club as a player, he served as captain.

1907 births
1988 deaths
Port Adelaide Football Club (SANFL) players
Australian rules footballers from South Australia